Limousin (French name, ;) is a dialect of the Occitan language, spoken in the three departments of Limousin, parts of Charente and the Dordogne in the southwest of France.

The first Occitan documents are in an early form of this dialect, particularly the Boecis, written around the year 1000.

Limousin is used primarily by people over age 50 in rural communities. All speakers speak French as a first or second language. Due to the French single language policy, it is not recognised by the government and therefore considered endangered by the linguistic community. A revivalist movement around the Félibrige and the Institut d'Estudis Occitans is active in Limousin (as well as in other parts of Occitania).

Differences from Languedocien
Most speakers and academics consider Limousin to be a dialect of Occitan. For more detailed information on this question, see the section on Occitan dialects and codification.

The following reproduces the first article of the Universal Declaration of Human Rights: "All human beings are born free and equal in dignity and rights. They are endowed with reason and conscience and should act towards one another in a spirit of brotherhood."

See also
 Occitan conjugation

References

External links
Institut d'Estudis Occitans dau Lemosin

Occitan language
Languages of France